The Shuttleworths is a British radio comedy that aired between 1993 and 2010, as five series and numerous specials on BBC Radio 4. It features "versatile singer/songwriter from Sheffield" John Shuttleworth, his family, and his neighbours, all performed by comedian Graham Fellows.

Format
The show revolves around John Shuttleworth and his family. Each episode is fifteen minutes long, which is narrated by John Shuttleworth himself. The episodes are recorded in a cassette tape made by John, featuring John's commentary addressed directly to the listener and eavesdropping on his own daily life. Characters include his wife (Mary), neighbour, agent Ken Worthington, their two teenage children Darren and Karen, and Mary's friend, Joan Chitty, all voiced by Graham Fellows. Events are interspersed with his own bizarre bouncy keyboard ditties on such varied matters as Austin Ambassadors, garden centres and toast, all performed (usually badly) on his Yamaha Portasound electronic keyboard.

Each programme is improvised, recorded and edited by Fellows using multitrack recording. Early series were recorded in Fellows' garden shed on a four-track cassette, and one series was recorded in a hotel bedroom. Fellows now makes his programmes in his own digital recording studio.

Related series

Shuttleworth's ShowTime
"was a six part series broadcast during November and December 1994 on Night time BBC Radio One. The series was produced by Paul Schlesinger and Jane Berthaud." It included guest stars such as poet Hovis Presley, comedian Mark Thomas, and singer Bonnie Tyler amongst regular characters of Ken Worthington, Mary Shuttleworth and the Shuttleworth children voiced by Fellows himself. Unlike the other series, this was never released commercially on CD, but a single 60 minute cassette tape "Best of Shuttleworth's ShowTime" was briefly available.

The notes above are taken directly from the liner notes of that cassette tape.

Radio Shuttleworth
From 1998, John's attempt to set up a local radio station "serving the Sheffield region - and a little bit further even" was broadcast as two series of Radio Shuttleworth. The programmes followed a similar format to The Shuttleworths, but their new length of thirty minutes allowed celebrity guest slots (Impress an Impresario, Make Mary Merry, Annoy a prospective employer) and opportunities to interview celebrities on the show. The show was a Radio 4 continuation of the 1994 Radio 1 series Shuttleworth's Showtime, and some guests and segments (including Make Mary Merry) had previously appeared on the Radio 1 incarnation.

John Shuttleworth's Open Mind
In John Shuttleworth's Open Mind, John attempted to investigate five unsolved phenomena that fascinate the nation. Each programme was thirty minutes long. This was effectively a third series of Radio Shuttleworth.

John Shuttleworth's Lounge Music
In John Shuttleworth's Lounge Music, John Shuttleworth invited musical guests to his home to sing one of his songs and one of their own, if they were lucky. Each programme was thirty minutes long.

Episode lists

The Shuttleworths

Radio Shuttleworth

John Shuttleworth's Open Mind

John Shuttleworth's Lounge Music

References

External links
 
 Radio Shuttleworth
 John Shuttleworth's Open Mind
 John Shuttleworth's Lounge Music

BBC Radio comedy programmes
1993 radio programme debuts
2010 radio programme endings
Radio programs about families
Sheffield in fiction